Sonne may refer to:

Surname
 Alma Sonne (1884–1977), general authority of The Church of Jesus Christ of Latter-day Saints (LDS Church)
 Brett Sonne (born 1989), Canadian professional ice hockey centre for Dornbirner EC of the Austrian Hockey League (EBEL)
 Carl Olaf Sonne (1882-1948), Danish bacteriologist and parasitologist
 Heinrich Sonne (1917–2011), highly decorated Hauptsturmführer in the Waffen-SS during World War II
 Isaiah Sonne (1887–1960), Austrian-born Jewish historian and bibliographer
 Jørgen Sonne (painter) (1801–1890), Danish painter best known for his battle paintings
 Jørgen Sonne (writer) (1925–2015), Danish lyricist and writer
 Karl Sonne (1890–1938), Swedish track and field athlete who competed in the 1912 Summer Olympics
 Niels Henry Sonne (1907–1994), noted librarian, a rare book curator, and expert on the Gutenberg Bible
 Ole Christian Saxtorph Sonne (1859–1941), Danish government minister and speaker of the Landsting, a chamber of the parliament
 Petrine Sonne (1870–1946), Danish stage and film actress

Other
Sonne (album), by Schiller, 2012
"Sonne (Schiller song), the title song
"Sonne" (Rammstein song), 2001
"Sonne" (Farin Urlaub song), 2005
RV Sonne, a German research vessel retired in 2014
RV Sonne (2014), a German research vessel
Sonne (navigation), a World War II-era radio navigation system also known as Consol

See also
Son (disambiguation)
Sun (disambiguation)